Mohamed Salah Zaray is a member of the African Union's Pan-African Parliament representing Tunisia.

References

Members of the Pan-African Parliament from Tunisia
Year of birth missing (living people)
Living people
Place of birth missing (living people)
21st-century Tunisian politicians